Tomeşti may refer to several places in Romania:

 Tomești, Harghita, a commune in Harghita County
 Tomești, Hunedoara, a commune in Hunedoara County
 Tomești, Iași, a commune in Iași County
 Tomești, Timiș, a commune in Timiș County
 Tomeşti, a village in Mogoș Commune, Alba County
 Tomeşti, a village in Pogana Commune, Vaslui County

See also 
 Toma (name)
 Tomeștii Noi and Tomeștii Vechi, villages in Balatina Commune, Glodeni District, Moldova
 Tomulești (disambiguation)